Pollex is a genus of moths of the family Erebidae erected by Michael Fibiger in 2007.

Species
Subgenus Bilobiana Fibiger, 2007
The flavimacula species group:
Pollex laosi Fibiger, 2007
Pollex flavimacula Fibiger, 2007
Pollex parunkudai Fibiger, 2007
Pollex diehli Fibiger, 2007
Pollex abovia Fibiger, 2007
Pollex kangeani Fibiger, 2007
Pollex lomboki Fibiger, 2007
Pollex silaui Fibiger, 2007
Pollex balabaci Fibiger, 2007
Pollex newguineai Fibiger, 2007
Pollex utarai Fibiger, 2007
Pollex sulawesii Fibiger, 2007
Pollex merisulawesii Fibiger, 2007
Pollex modus Fibiger, 2008
The speideli species group:
Pollex philippini Fibiger, 2007
Pollex lobifera (Hampson, 1926)
Pollex sapamori Fibiger, 2007
Pollex poguei Fibiger, 2007
Pollex speideli Fibiger, 2007
Pollex parabala Fibiger, 2007
Pollex mindai Fibiger, 2007
Pollex angustiae Fibiger, 2007
The schintlmeisteri species group:
Pollex schintlmeisteri Fibiger, 2007
The bulli species group:
Pollex oculus Fibiger, 2007
Pollex bulli Fibiger, 2007
Pollex taurus Fibiger, 2007
The hamus species group:
Pollex hamus Fibiger, 2007
Pollex sansdigit Fibiger, 2007
The spina species group:
Pollex flax Fibiger, 2007
Pollex paraspina Fibiger, 2007
Pollex spina Fibiger, 2007
The diabolo species group:
Pollex diabolo Fibiger, 2007
The spastica species group:
Pollex spastica Fibiger, 2007
The mindanaoi species group:
Pollex mindanaoi Fibiger, 2007
The dumogai species group:
Pollex dumogai Fibiger, 2007
The circulari species group:
Pollex kononenkoi Fibiger, 2007
Pollex palopoi Fibiger, 2007
Pollex circulari Fibiger, 2007
Pollex pouchi Fibiger, 2007
Subgenus Proma Fibiger, 2007
The jurivetei species group:
Pollex lafontainei Fibiger, 2007
Pollex archi Fibiger, 2007
Pollex jurivetei Fibiger, 2007
Pollex serami Fibiger, 2007
The maxima species group:
Pollex maxima Fibiger, 2007
Pollex paramaxima Fibiger, 2007
Subgenus Pollex Fibiger, 2007
Pollex crispus Fibiger, 2007
Pollex furca Fibiger, 2007

References

Micronoctuini
Noctuoidea genera